Notaspidea, also known as the sidegill slugs, is an artificial grouping of sea slugs which is now split into two unrelated groups, the Umbraculida and the Pleurobranchomorpha.

Taxonomic history
Notaspidea, also known as the sidegill slugs, was a suborder which included both sea slugs and sea snails or false limpets, marine opisthobranch gastropod molluscs in the subclass Orthogastropoda.
However, in the newer taxonomy of Bouchet & Rocroi (2005), the families Umbraculidae and Tylodinidae belong to the superfamily Umbraculoidea Dall, 1889, part of the clade Umbraculida. Grande et al. (2004) found Umbraculoidea to be a sister clade to the Cephalaspidea (Acteonoidea excluded).

The families Tylodinidae and Umbraculidae have large limpet-like external shells and a small mantle, while the species in the family Pleurobranchidae have a prominent mantle and an internal shell that becomes reduced or is lost in adults. Many species produce mantle secretions as a chemical defense  against predators

Families
 Pleurobranchidae Menke, 1828
 Tylodinidae Gray, 1847
 Umbraculidae Dall, 1889

Notes

References
 
 Powell A. W. B., New Zealand Mollusca, William Collins Publishers Ltd, Auckland, New Zealand 1979 

Obsolete gastropod taxa